Michel Verhoeve (29 January 1939 – 4 December 2019) was a French footballer. He competed in the men's tournament at the 1968 Summer Olympics.

References

External links
 

1939 births
2019 deaths
French footballers
Olympic footballers of France
Footballers at the 1968 Summer Olympics
People from Lambersart
Association football defenders
Sportspeople from Nord (French department)
Mediterranean Games gold medalists for France
Mediterranean Games medalists in football
Competitors at the 1967 Mediterranean Games
Footballers from Hauts-de-France
Valenciennes FC players
AC Cambrai players